Betty Rothenberg is an American television and theatre director. She directed The Young and the Restless episodes from 1984 to 2002.

Awards and nominations
Daytime Emmy
1986, 1987, 1988, 1989, 1996, 1997, 1998, 1999, 2001, 2002: Won for The Young and the Restless 

1990,1991, 1992, 1993, 1994, 1995, 2000: Nominated for The Young and the Restless

Directors Guild of America (DGA)
1997: Won for The Young and the Restless

Television credits
On Location: George Carlin at Phoenix: assistant to producer (1978)
The Young and the Restless: associate director/director (1984–2002)

References

External links

www.variety.com/article

American television directors
Living people
Year of birth missing (living people)